"Shades of Gray" is a song which was written by Barry Mann and Cynthia Weil, and recorded by The Monkees for their 1967 album Headquarters. Lead vocals were shared by Davy Jones and Peter Tork, and this is the only track on the album featuring instruments performed by session musicians instead of the band members (and producer Chip Douglas) themselves (French horn and cello).

The song had been recorded previously by a folk-rock trio, the Will-O-Bees, and released in 1967 on the Date Records label (Date 45 #1543).  Although the Will-O-Bees' version was accorded "Chart SpotlightsPredicted to reach the HOT 100" status in Billboard Magazine's issue of December 31, 1966, the record is little known today.

"Shades of Gray" has been included on several compilation albums by the Monkees, including Barrel Full of Monkees, Re-Focus, and The Best of The Monkees

Sons of Champlin recorded the song at about the same time, but the Headquarters version was released first.  The album Fat City, released in 2015 by The Thick Boys, finally featured the Sons of Champlin version of the song, named "Shades of thickness" (whereas the original Monkees release was titled "Shades of Gray").

Sandy Posey covered the song on her 1968 album Looking At You.

Another version was recorded in 2016 by P.K. Limited (Screen Gems/Columbia Music songwriters Dan Peyton and Marty Kaniger); it was featured in the film Getting Straight.

A cover of "Shades of Gray" by Mind Venertion appears on the album, Through the Looking Glass - Indie Pop Plays The Monkees,."

Personnel
Credits from Andrew Sandoval.

Lead vocals by Davy Jones and Peter Tork
Backing vocals: Micky Dolenz, Davy Jones, Peter Tork
Steel Guitar: Michael Nesmith
Bass: Jerry Yester
Drums: Micky Dolenz
Tambourine: Davy Jones
Piano: Peter Tork
Maracas: Davy Jones

Session musicians and production staff 
Cello: Frederick Seykora
French Horn: Vincent DeRosa
Engineered by: Hank Cicalo

In popular culture
In the 1986 film Soul Man, C. Thomas Howell's character Mark attempts to impress a girl, so he says, "Today there is no black or white, only shades of gray," a direct quote from the song.

References

External links
monkees.net Lyrics to the Monkees song

The Monkees songs
1965 songs
Songs written by Barry Mann
Songs with lyrics by Cynthia Weil
1960s ballads
Pop ballads